Lily Branscombe (born Lillian Rodman, February 28, 1876 – September 26, 1970) was a stage and film actress from New Zealand.

Biography
Branscombe was born as Lillian Rodman in Carterton, in the North Island of New Zealand, and educated in New South Wales, Australia.
She acted with the Maggie Moore Company in Australia and New Zealand before moving to the United States of America around 1900. There, she acted with the Frawley Company and later in silent films produced by the Essanay Company, opposite stars such as Francis X. Bushman, Bryant Washburn, and John Steppling. She also appeared in a number of episodes of the short comedic film series Alkali Ike in 1911 and 1912.

Personal life
In 1900, she married Herbert Ashton in San Francisco.

Filmography 
 He Fought for the U.S.A. (1911)
 The Goodfellow's Christmas Eve (1911)
 For Memory's Sake, 1911
 Alias Billy Sargent (1912)
 Detective Dorothy, 1912
 The Melody of Love, 1912
 Her Hour of Triumph,1912
The Snare (1912)

References

External links

1876 births
1970 deaths
People from Carterton, New Zealand
New Zealand silent film actresses